Acrolophus ceramochra is a moth of the family Acrolophidae. It is found in Colombia.

References

ceramochra
Moths described in 1929